Tuscarora High School is a secondary school located at 5312 Ballenger Creek Pike just south of the corporate boundaries of Frederick, Maryland, United States.

History
Tuscarora High School opened in 2003. As of the 2019–2020 school year, the enrollment was 1,590 students.

Teams and activities
Tuscarora has many extracurricular sports teams and clubs.

Demographics

Ethnicity

White: 601

Black: 540

American Indian/Alaskan Native: *fewer than 10*

Asian: 112

Hawaiian/Pacific Islander: *fewer than 10*

Hispanic: 338

Capacity

School Capacity: 1,606 (Does not include portable classrooms)

Total Enrollment: 1,491

References

External links
Official website

Educational institutions established in 2003
Public high schools in Maryland
Schools in Frederick County, Maryland
2003 establishments in Maryland